Shinola is a live album by American jazz guitarist John Scofield, recorded in 1981 and released in 1982 by Enja Records. It was the second recording of Scofield's trio with bass guitarist Steve Swallow and drummer Adam Nussbaum. In 2009 the album was reissued on compact disc in a 24-bit remastered edition with new artwork.

Track listing

Personnel
John Scofield – electric guitar
Steve Swallow – bass guitar
Adam Nussbaum – drums

References 

1982 live albums
John Scofield live albums
Enja Records live albums